Psittaculidae is a family containing Old World parrots. It consists of five subfamilies: Agapornithinae, Loriinae, Platycercinae, Psittacellinae and Psittaculinae.

This family has been accepted into The Clements Checklist of Birds of the World in 2014, and the IOC World Bird List.

The family contains 192 species divided into 53 genera.

References

 
Parrots